The 2022–23 Terrafirma Dyip season was the 8th season of the franchise in the Philippine Basketball Association (PBA).

Key dates
May 15: The PBA Season 47 draft was held at the Robinsons Place Manila in Manila.

Draft picks

Roster

Philippine Cup

Eliminations

Standings

Game log

|-bgcolor=ffcccc
| 1
| June 8
| NLEX
| L 102–105
| Ramos, Tiongson (18)
| Javi Gómez de Liaño (9)
| Joshua Munzon (6)
| Smart Araneta Coliseum
| 0–1
|-bgcolor=ffcccc
| 2
| June 11
| NorthPort
| L 86–100
| Munzon, Tiongson (24)
| Munzon, Ramos (8)
| Munzon, Ramos, Tiongson (4)
| Ynares Center
| 0–2
|-bgcolor=ffcccc
| 3
| June 17
| Phoenix
| L 74–97
| Joseph Gabayni (16)
| Gabayni, Tiongson (9)
| JP Calvo (5)
| Ynares Center
| 0–3
|-bgcolor=ffcccc
| 4
| June 22
| Converge
| L 84–97
| Joseph Gabayni (18)
| Joshua Munzon (10)
| Joshua Munzon (5)
| SM Mall of Asia Arena
| 0–4
|-bgcolor=ffcccc
| 5
| June 25
| Blackwater
| L 70–107
| Joshua Munzon (17)
| Cahilig, Ramos (11)
| Gómez de Liaño, Munzon (3)
| Ynares Center
| 0–5

|-bgcolor=ffcccc
| 6
| July 1
| TNT
| L 86–114
| Joshua Munzon (25)
| Eric Camson (9)
| JP Calvo (3)
| Smart Araneta Coliseum
| 0–6
|-bgcolor=ffcccc
| 7
| July 6
| Barangay Ginebra
| L 82–106
| Juami Tiongson (24)
| Andreas Cahilig (11)
| Joshua Munzon (5)
| Smart Araneta Coliseum
| 0–7
|-bgcolor=ffcccc
| 8
| July 8
| Magnolia
| L 83–104
| JP Calvo (20)
| Andreas Cahilig (5)
| Joseph Gabayni (4)
| Smart Araneta Coliseum
| 0–8
|-bgcolor=ffcccc
| 9
| July 14
| San Miguel
| L 108–109 (OT)
| Eric Camson (20)
| Cahilig, Gabayni (10)
| JP Calvo (8)
| Smart Araneta Coliseum
| 0–9
|-bgcolor=ffcccc
| 10
| July 16
| Rain or Shine
| L 82–97
| Aldrech Ramos (21)
| Cahilig, Calvo, Ramos (9)
| JP Calvo (8)
| SM Mall of Asia Arena
| 0–10
|-bgcolor=ffcccc
| 11
| July 21
| Meralco
| L 89–105
| Aldrech Ramos (24)
| Cahilig, Gabayni, Ramos (6)
| Paolo Javelona (6)
| Smart Araneta Coliseum
| 0–11

Commissioner's Cup

Eliminations

Standings

Game log

|-bgcolor=ffcccc
| 1
| September 23, 2022
| Converge
| L 110–124
| Lester Prosper (43)
| Lester Prosper (25)
| Alex Cabagnot (8)
| PhilSports Arena
| 0–1
|-bgcolor=ffcccc
| 2
| September 28, 2022
| Magnolia
| L 92–100
| Lester Prosper (41)
| Lester Prosper (19)
| Alex Cabagnot (7)
| SM Mall of Asia Arena
| 0–2

|-bgcolor=ffcccc
| 3
| October 2, 2022
| Rain or Shine
| L 94–106
| Lester Prosper (20)
| Lester Prosper (16)
| Alex Cabagnot (9)
| Smart Araneta Coliseum
| 0–3
|-bgcolor=ffcccc
| 4
| October 7, 2022
| Meralco
| L 92–105
| Lester Prosper (35)
| Lester Prosper (18)
| Alex Cabagnot (9)
| Smart Araneta Coliseum
| 0–4
|-bgcolor=ffcccc
| 5
| October 14, 2022
| Blackwater
| L 86–93
| Lester Prosper (18)
| Lester Prosper (11)
| Alex Cabagnot (4)
| Smart Araneta Coliseum
| 0–5
|-bgcolor=ffcccc
| 6
| October 21, 2022
| Bay Area
| L 76–130
| Juami Tiongson (21)
| Andreas Cahilig (8)
| Camson, Gabayni, Prosper, Tiongson (2)
| PhilSports Arena
| 0–6
|-bgcolor=ffcccc
| 7
| October 28, 2022
| Barangay Ginebra
| L 90–111
| Eric Camson (21)
| Lester Prosper (8)
| Alex Cabagnot (7)
| Smart Araneta Coliseum
| 0–7

|-bgcolor=ffcccc
| 8
| November 5, 2022
| TNT
| L 90–121
| Lester Prosper (32)
| Lester Prosper (15)
| Cabagnot, Calvo (5)
| Ynares Center
| 0–8
|-bgcolor=ffcccc
| 9
| November 12, 2022
| NorthPort
| L 85–91
| Lester Prosper (23)
| Lester Prosper (18)
| Juami Tiongson (7)
| Ynares Center
| 0–9
|-bgcolor=ccffcc
| 10
| November 18, 2022
| NLEX
| W 124–114 (OT)
| Lester Prosper (50)
| Lester Prosper (19)
| Juami Tiongson (9)
| Smart Araneta Coliseum
| 1–9
|-bgcolor=ffcccc
| 11
| November 23, 2022
| San Miguel
| L 103–131
| Juami Tiongson (28)
| Camson, Gabayni (7)
| Gelo Alolino (6)
| PhilSports Arena
| 1–10
|-bgcolor=ffcccc
| 12
| November 26, 2022
| Phoenix
| L 84–135
| Joshua Munzon (12)
| Eric Camson (12)
| Munzon, Tiongson (3)
| PhilSports Arena
| 1–11

Governors' Cup

Eliminations

Standings

Game log

|-bgcolor=ffcccc
| 1
| January 26
| Converge
| L 115–130
| Jordan Williams (46)
| Ramos, Williams (6)
| Alex Cabagnot (6)
| PhilSports Arena
| 0–1
|-bgcolor=ccffcc
| 2
| January 28
| Meralco
| W 96–88
| Juami Tiongson (30)
| Eric Camson (10)
| Alex Cabagnot (7)
| Ynares Center
| 1–1

|-bgcolor=ffcccc
| 3
| February 3
| San Miguel
| L 102–122
| Jordan Williams (30)
| Camson, Williams (8)
| Alex Cabagnot (6)
| Ynares Center
| 1–2
|-bgcolor=ccffcc
| 4
| February 9
| Blackwater
| W 119–106
| Jordan Williams (57)
| Jordan Williams (11)
| Cabagnot, Tiongson, Williams (5)
| Smart Araneta Coliseum
| 2–2
|-bgcolor=ffcccc
| 5
| February 11
| TNT
| L 109–131
| Jordan Williams (38)
| Jordan Williams (10)
| Jordan Williams (6)
| SM Mall of Asia Arena
| 2–3
|-bgcolor=ffcccc
| 6
| February 16
| Rain or Shine
| L 118–120
| Jordan Williams (30)
| Jordan Williams (16)
| Cabagnot, Calvo, Williams (4)
| Smart Araneta Coliseum
| 2–4
|-bgcolor=ffcccc
| 7
| February 18
| Phoenix
| L 100–125 
| Juami Tiongson (27)
| Jordan Williams (10) 
| Alex Cabagnot (6)
| Smart Araneta Coliseum
| 2–5
|-bgcolor=ffcccc
| 8
| February 22
| NorthPort
| L 100–115 
| Jordan Williams (25)
| Eric Camson (13)
| Alolino, Tiongson (4)
| PhilSports Arena
| 2–6

|-bgcolor=ffcccc
| 9
| March 2
| NLEX
| L 125–142 
| Juami Tiongson (38)
| Gabayni, Williams (10)
| JP Calvo (10)
| Smart Araneta Coliseum
| 2–7
|-bgcolor=ffcccc
| 10
| March 4
| Magnolia
| L 115–121 (OT)  
| Jordan Williams (45)
| Joseph Gabayni (10)
| Daquioag, Tiongson, Williams (4)
| PhilSports Arena
| 2–8
|-bgcolor=ffcccc
| 11
| March 8
| Barangay Ginebra
| L 104–109
| Jordan Williams (35)
| Jordan Williams (10)
| JP Calvo (6)
| Ynares Center
| 2–9

Transactions

Free agency

Signings

Trades

Pre-season

Commissioner's Cup

Recruited imports

References

Terrafirma Dyip seasons
Terrafirma Dyip